Elena Glurjidze is a senior principal ballerina at the English National Ballet.

Biography
Elena was born into the family of Georgian scientist L. Glurjidze. From an early age she showed a passion for the arts and ballet. She started training at the School of Choreography in Tbilisi, Georgia, and later trained in St. Petersburg at the Vaganova Ballet Academy. She joined English National Ballet in 2002, and was voted "Best Female Dancer" in 2007.

References

External links
Elena Glurdjidze: Senior Principal dancer, English National Ballet website

Ballerinas from Georgia (country)
Living people
Year of birth missing (living people)
Female dancers from Tbilisi